Caloptilia laurifoliae is a moth of the family Gracillariidae. It is known from the Canary Islands and Madeira.

The larvae feed on Laurus azorica. They mine the leaves of their host plant. The mine consists of a lower- or upper-surface, epidermal corridor that usually begins at the midrib and runs towards the leaf margin. From here, a tentiform mine is made that is partly hidden under the folded leaf margin. Older larvae live freely in a rolled leaf. Mines are usually made in young leaves.

References

laurifoliae
Moths of Africa
Moths described in 1927